Eoin Ryan may refer to:

 Eoin Ryan Snr (1920–2001), Irish Fianna Fáil politician, senator 1957–1987
 His son Eoin Ryan Jnr (born 1953), Irish Fianna Fáil politician, Member of the European Parliament, former Teachta Dála (TD)